Ryvarden Lighthouse is a coastal lighthouse on the western coast of the municipality of Sveio in Vestland county, Norway. The lighthouse was established in 1849 to mark the southern shore of the entrance to the Bømlafjorden from the sea. In 1984, the lighthouse was automated and it no longer needed a live-in lighthouse keeper on the site. In 2005, the municipality bought the building and the buildings are now used as a regional cultural centre/museum.

The light on top emits a white, red or green light, depending on direction, occulting three times every 10 seconds. The lighthouse is in use from dusk until dawn every day from 1 July until 10 June each year (it is not in use for part of June due to the midnight sun in this part of the world).

See also
 List of lighthouses in Norway
 Lighthouses in Norway

References

External links

 Norsk Fyrhistorisk Forening 

Lighthouses completed in 1849
Lighthouses in Vestland
Museums in Vestland
Sveio
1849 establishments in Norway